The following is a list of notable people who were either born in, are current residents of, or are otherwise closely associated with or from the city of Coimbatore, India.

A
 K. V. Subrahmanya Aiyar - historian

B
balasubramaniam - tennis player

C
 T. S. Avinashilingam Chettiar - educationist and politician
 R. K. Shanmukham Chetty - industrialist and politician

D
 G R Damodaran - educationist

F
 Ankit Fadia - author and public speaker

G
 Goundamani - film actor
 V. C. Palanisami Gounder - politician

H
H. V. Hande - politician 
Hiphop Tamizha - music director, actor , motivational speaker, social activist.
Githa Hariharan - author
Andrew Harvey - author, religious speaker

K
Karthick Naren- tamil filmmaker, writer, producer & actor
K. V. Kandaswamy - politician
 Sundaram Karivardhan - motor racing pioneer and entrepreneur
 Karthi - actor
 Narain Karthikeyan - motor racing driver
 D. Sreeram Kumar - Indian Army major
 V. R. Naren Kumar - motorsport driver

L
 C. S. Lakshmi - writer
 K. G. Lakshminarayan - cricket umpire

M
 Manivannan - actor and director
 Charles McCarthy - cricketer
 C. S. Ratnasabhapathy Mudaliar - industrialist
 Pithukuli Murugadas - singer 
 Arunachalam Muruganantham - entrepreneur

N
 Gopalswamy Doraiswamy Naidu - inventor and engineer
 P. Nagarajan - politician
 S. M. Sriramulu Naidu - film producer
 V. Nanammal - fitness evangelist and yoga teacher
 Jagadeesan Narayan - cricketer
 Karthick Naren - film director
 P.R. Natarajan - politician

O
 Om Prakash - cinematographer

P
 Sai Pallavi - actress 
 K. C. S. Paniker - painter
 Rajshree Pathy - businesswoman
 Arogyaswami Paulraj - scientist
 C. K. Prahalad - economist

R
 P. L. Raj - choreographer
 C. T. Rajakantham - actor
 K V Ramachandran - music critic
 G. Ramaswamy - chartered accountant
 C. P. Radhakrishnan - politician

S
 S. V. Sahasranamam - actor
 Amit Sareen - author
 Sathyaraj - actor and comedian
 Adam Sinclair - hockey player
 Sivakumar - actor and public speaker
 Aushik Srinivas - cricketer
 T. R. Sundaram - actor
 V. A. Sundaram - independence activist
 Suriya - actor and film producer
 R.V. Swamy - author

V
 Nirupama Vaidyanathan - tennis player
 G. R. Vaishnav - volleyball player
 S. M. Velusamy - politician
 Adhithya Venkatapathy - rapper who forms a part of the Tamil hip-hop group Hiphop Tamizha
 Siddharth Venugopal - actor
 Swamikannu Vincent - cinema producer and pioneer

References

People from Coimbatore
P01
Lists of people by city in India
Lists of people from Tamil Nadu
Coimbatore